Christian Pinzón Barajas (born June 24, 1998) is an American soccer player who plays for USL Championship club Rio Grande Valley FC.

Career

Youth
Pinzón attended Bellflower High School, where he scored 86 goals in 71 games and won two CIF-Southern Section titles. He was the Long Beach Press-Telegram Player of the Year as a senior. He also played club soccer with local side California Rush.

College & amateur
In 2017, Pinzón went to play college soccer at California State University, Fullerton. Despite his senior season been cancelled due to the COVID-19 pandemic, he went on to make 54 appearances for the Titans, scoring 14 goals and tallying seven assists. In 2019, he earned First Team All-Conference honors and All-Far West Region Second Team honors.

While at college, Pinzón also played with FC Golden State Force during their 2019 season, making a single appearance and scoring a single goal during their NPSL season, and making a single appearance in their USL League Two season.

Professional
On January 21, 2021, Pinzón was selected 47th overall in the 2021 MLS SuperDraft by Chicago Fire. However, he wasn't signed by the team. Soon after, he earned a trial with Guadalajara, and signed with their Liga de Expansión MX reserve team Tapatío in June 2021.

On July 6, 2022, Pinzón returned to the United States, signing with USL Championship side Rio Grande Valley FC.

References

External links

1998 births
American people of Mexican descent
American soccer players
Association football midfielders
Cal State Fullerton Titans men's soccer players
Chicago Fire FC draft picks
FC Golden State Force players
Living people
National Premier Soccer League players
People from Bellflower, California
Rio Grande Valley FC Toros players
Soccer players from California
USL League Two players
USL Championship players